The 2021 Liga Profesional de Primera División season, also known as the Campeonato Uruguayo de Primera División 2021, was the 118th season of the Uruguayan Primera División, Uruguay's top-flight football league, and the 91st in which it is professional. The season, named "Dr. Tabaré Vázquez" after the late former President of Uruguay and chairman of Progreso from 1979 to 1989, started on 15 May and ended on 7 December 2021, with the starting date having been pushed back from early 2021 due to the late conclusion of the previous season owing to the COVID-19 pandemic.

The tournament was originally scheduled to start on 8 May, however its date of start was postponed for a week to 15 May per request from the Uruguayan government. Peñarol won their fifty-first league title at the end of the season, winning the Torneo Clausura and placing first in the season's aggregate table and then beating Torneo Apertura winners Plaza Colonia on penalties in the semi-final played on 7 December. Nacional were the defending champions.

Format changes
For the 2021 season, the competition was scheduled to run for eight months, from May to December, and had a change from the previous editions with the elimination of the Torneo Intermedio which is usually played midway into the season and adds seven matchdays to the league schedule. This change was intended to leave extra time available to finish the season before the end of the year in the event the health emergency caused by the COVID-19 pandemic forced any suspension of matches in the course of the season. With that change, clubs only played 15 matches in the Torneo Apertura and 15 matches in the Torneo Clausura, for a total of 30 matches in the season, as well as the ones belonging to the Championship playoff for the clubs that eventually qualified for it. Matches would only be scheduled on weekends, with mid-week dates to be used only if necessary due to the pandemic.

Teams

The three lowest placed teams in the relegation table of the 2020 season, Defensor Sporting, Danubio, and Cerro, were relegated to the Segunda División for the 2021 season. They were replaced by Cerrito, Sud América, and Villa Española, who were promoted from the Segunda División.

Managerial changes

Torneo Apertura
The Torneo Apertura, named "Eduardo Roca Couture", was the first tournament of the 2021 season. It began on 15 May and ended on 22 August 2021.

Standings

Results

Torneo Clausura
The Torneo Clausura, named "Marcos Basiaco", was the second and last tournament of the 2021 season. It began on 11 September and ended on 5 December 2021.

Standings

Results

Aggregate table

Championship playoff

Semi-final

Finals
Since Peñarol, who had the best record in the aggregate table, won the semi-final, they became champions automatically and the finals were not played. Nacional became runners-up as the second-placed team in the aggregate table. Both teams qualified for the 2022 Copa Libertadores group stage.

Top scorers
{| class="wikitable" border="1"
|-
! Rank
! Name
! Club
! Goals
|-
| align=center | 1
| Maximiliano Silvera
|Cerrito
| align=center | 21
|-
| align=center | 2
| Matías Arezo
|River Plate
| align=center | 16
|-
| align=center | 3
| Gonzalo Bergessio
|Nacional
| align=center | 15
|-
| align=center | 4
| Federico Martínez
|Liverpool
| align=center | 14
|-
| rowspan=2 align=center | 5
| Agustín Álvarez Martínez
|Peñarol
| rowspan=2 align=center | 13
|-
| Leandro Otormín
|Cerro Largo
|-
| align=center | 7
| Juan Ignacio Ramírez
|Liverpool
| align=center | 11
|-
| rowspan=2 align=center | 8
| Sebastián Guerrero
|Montevideo City Torque
| rowspan=2 align=center | 10
|-
| Salomón Rodríguez
|Rentistas
|-
| rowspan=3 align=center | 10
| Lucas Di Yorio
|Cerro Largo
| rowspan=3 align=center | 9
|-
| Renzo López
|Montevideo Wanderers / Plaza Colonia
|-
| Lucas Rodríguez
|Montevideo City Torque
|}

Source: AUF

Relegation
Relegation is determined at the end of the season by computing an average of the number of points earned per game over the two most recent seasons: 2020 and 2021. The three teams with the lowest average at the end of the season were relegated to the Segunda División for the following season.

Season awards
On 28 December 2021 the AUF announced the winners of the season awards, who were chosen by its Technical Staff based on voting by managers and captains of the 16 Primera División teams as well as a group of local sports journalists. 30 players were nominated for Best Player and the Team of the Season according to their ratings and evaluations by the Technical Staff throughout the season.

References

External links
Asociación Uruguaya de Fútbol - Campeonato Uruguayo 

2021
2021 in Uruguayan football
Uruguay
Uruguay